Shahpura Assembly constituency is one of constituencies of Rajasthan Legislative Assembly in the Jaipur Rural (Lok Sabha constituency) in India.

Shahpura constituency covers all voters from  Shahpura tehsil excluding Chhapra Khurd, Nathawala, Rampura and Saiwar of ILRC Shahpura and part of Chomu tehsil, which includes Amarpura, Khejroli, Nangal Koju, Niwana, Tigariya and Nangal Bharda of ILRC Khejroli.

References

See also 
 Member of the Legislative Assembly (India)

Jaipur district
Assembly constituencies of Rajasthan